Alexandra Dulgheru was the defending champion, but lost in the quarterfinals to Çağla Büyükakçay.

Büyükakçay went on to win the title, defeating Klára Koukalová in the final, 6–7(4–7), 6–4, 6–4.

Seeds

Main draw

Finals

Top half

Bottom half

References 
 Main draw

Al Habtoor Tennis Challenge - Singles
Al Habtoor Tennis Challenge
2015 in Emirati tennis